Corbeni may refer to the following places in Romania:

 Corbeni, a commune in Argeș County
 Corbeni, a village in the commune Racovița, Brăila County
 Corbeni, a village in the town Balș, Olt County
 Corbeni (river), a river in Bihor County